Tonatiuh Gutiérrez (born November 20, 1929) is a former swimmer from Mexico. He competed in the freestyle and the backstroke events.

Gutiérrez twice competed for his native country at the Summer Olympics of 1948 and 1952. He also won two medals (silver and bronze) in the men's freestyle events at the 1951 Pan American Games.

References
 sports-reference

1929 births
Living people
Mexican male swimmers
Male backstroke swimmers
Mexican male freestyle swimmers
Olympic swimmers of Mexico
Swimmers at the 1948 Summer Olympics
Swimmers at the 1951 Pan American Games
Swimmers at the 1952 Summer Olympics
Pan American Games silver medalists for Mexico
Pan American Games bronze medalists for Mexico
Pan American Games medalists in swimming
Central American and Caribbean Games gold medalists for Mexico
Competitors at the 1950 Central American and Caribbean Games
Competitors at the 1954 Central American and Caribbean Games
Central American and Caribbean Games medalists in swimming
Medalists at the 1951 Pan American Games
20th-century Mexican people